College of Military Engineering (CME) is a technical and tactical engineering training institution of the Indian Army Corps of Engineers of the Indian Army. Training of Combat Engineers, Military Engineering Service, Border Roads Engineering Services (BRES) and Survey is done here.

The college it is situated at Dapodi on NH 4, adjacent to the Khadki cantonment, a large army base in Pune district, north of the Pune city. Established in 1943, as the 'School of Military Engineering' (SME) at Roorkee, apart from imparting training to Indian army officers and those from friendly countries, the college also plays an advisory role to the Indian Army, and is involved in research projects and experimentation.

History
Prior its establishment, the officers of Corps of Engineers were trained at the Royal School of Military Engineering, United Kingdom along with the Corps of Royal Engineers. Between 1934 and 1943 they received training at Thompson College of Engineering, Roorkee, now IIT Roorkee.

During the World War II, the dedicated school to impart combat engineering training to officers was set up at Roorkee, the School of Military Engineering (SME) in 1943, though it continued to depend on Thomason College for technical training, subsequently post-independence in 1948, SME moved to Dapodi in Pune, its present location. In November 1951, the SME was upgraded to the status of a college, with it degree engineering courses recognised by the Institution of Engineers.

Work on permanent construction began in 1948 and most of the accommodation was completed by 1958. The second phase of expansion took place after 1963 necessitated by the expansion of the Indian Army.

 Faculty of Civil Engineering,
 Faculty of Electrical and Mechanical Engineering
 Diploma wing (Courses for subordinates)

Courses
CME offers training for personnel, both Officers and Personnel Below Officers Rank (PBOR) of the Corps of Engineers, other arms & services, Navy, Air Force, Para-Military forces, Police and also civilians. Its students also include soldiers from friendly foreign countries like the Maldives, Sri Lanka, Bangladesh and Nepal. The college is affiliated to Jawaharlal Nehru University (JNU) for its B Tech and MTech degrees. And its graduate and post graduate courses are recognised by The 'All India Council for Technical Education' (AICTE) and University of Pune.
 Courses for Engineering Officers for 3 years duration;
 M Tech in Structural Engineering and Energy Systems
B Tech in Civil Engineering, Electrical Engineering and Mechanical Engineering
 For Corps of EME Officers first 3 semesters of B Tech degree for 1years;
 B Tech in Mechanical Engineering
 For Corps of Signal Officers first 3 semesters of B Tech degree for 1 years;
 B Tech in Communication Engineering
 Two years Diploma courses for subordinate staff in Electrical, Civil and Draughtsperson category.
2 months adp (f)

The campus
Access is available only to military personnel and civilians working or living inside CME. A gate pass (identification) is required to enter the CME premises.

Notable places in CME 

 The CME lake – A lakeside, also includes a restricted fishing area
 The CME rowing channel - A beautiful 5 Km (to and fro) rowing channel with a restricted bird watching area.
 Sarvatra Bir – A bird sanctuary by the CME lake
 Harkirat Singh Theatre – An open-air theatre which screens Hollywood and Bollywood movies
 CME shopping complex – A shopping complex for CME residents. Almost all facilities exist inside the campus
 CME Information Technology Wing – IT learning and development centre
 IT courses held for Army Engineering Groups. Latest software are being developed here
 Saravatra Hall – A concert hall where important events are staged, including school events
 Officers Institute – An institute for all to Officers. It has a bar, a restaurant and a dance floor
 HQ Mess Corps of Engineers
 Corps Equipment Museum
 Corps of Engineers Archives & Museum
 CME Library
 CME Cyber Cafe – A cyber cafe providing internet facilities, mainly to the YOs (Young Officers), children and teenagers
 CTW (Cadets Training Wing) – An institute that provides proper army training to new cadets

Schools in CME 
 Kendriya Vidyalaya (KV CME) – CBSE education school.
 Holloway School – Raised where the former KV was, a school offering Maharashtra State Board education.
 Regimental School – Another school offering Maharashtra State Board education.

See also
 Indian National Defence University
 Military Academies in India
 Sainik school

References

External links
 College of Military Engineering, Pune webpage at Indian Army website
 College of Military Engineering, Pune at Bharat Rakshak

Engineering colleges in Pune
Military education and training in India
Education in Pimpri-Chinchwad
Indian Army
Indian Army Corps of Engineers
Educational institutions established in 1943
Universities and colleges in Pune
1943 establishments in India